KRIWI is a Belarusian newFolk and clubEthno band. The band name means "a person belonging to the East Slavic tribe of Kryvians". KRIWI uses a variety of European folk instruments (zurna, balalaika, hurdy-gurdy, bagpipes, cimbalom, flutes, reeds, percussion) and mixing them with modern technology of synthesizer and samples, video-WJ InterFilmWostok and with vocals of Veranika Kruhlova (Veronika Kruglova) Вероника Круглова, Waléra Kanischtscheff-creator since 1996 : worldwide producing & booking of the „KRIWI“, official mail: kriwiby_aol.com

Discography

Studio albums 
 Kriwi made in Belpunkt (1996)
 Hej-Loli (1997)
 Musica Vitale Di Grine Kuzine-Kriwi-Zollitsc (2000)
 Minsk-Berlin (2002)
 Live in Berlin (2004)
 KRIWI Live — homevideo (2005)
 InterFilmWostok fest — KRIWIvideo concert minsk (2006)
 Traukamurauka (2013)
 Pojdsem (2020)
 Kriwi-InterFilmWostok compilation (2022)

Singles 
 KRIWI (2000)
 KRIWI (2008)

References

External links 
 Official home page
 actual info
 books 1
 books 2
 books 3

Belarusian rock music groups
Belarusian folk music groups
Belarusian folk rock groups